Gol Tappeh District is a district (bakhsh) in Kabudarahang County, Hamadan Province, Iran. At the 2006 census, its population was 23,647, in 5,242 families.  The District has one city: Gol Tappeh. The District has three rural districts (dehestan): Ali Sadr Rural District, Gol Tappeh Rural District, and Mehraban-e Sofla Rural District.

References 

Kabudarahang County
Districts of Hamadan Province